Calamotropha javaica is a moth in the family Crambidae. It was described by Stanisław Błeszyński in 1961. It is found on Java.

References

Crambinae
Moths described in 1961